New World Sound is an Australian electronic DJ and record production duo, composed of Tyrone James and Jesse Taylor. In 2013, they released the single, "Flute", with Thomas Newson.

Career

2012–present 
On 5 November 2012 New World Sound released their debut single "Bantam". On 31 May 2013 they released the single "Cube" with Ryan Kristo. On 27 September 2013 they released the single "Aye". In November 2013 they released the single "Flute" with Thomas Newson. The song charted in Belgium, France, Netherlands and Switzerland . On 28 February 2014 they released the single "Shakedown" with Uberjak'D. On 25 April 2014 they released the single "Colors" with Osen featuring vocals from Juanita Timpanaro. On 16 May 2014 they released the single "The Buzz" with Timmy Trumpet. On 17 June 2014 they released the single "Pineapple" / "Spoon". On 15 August 2014 they released the single "How to Twerk". On 21 December 2014 New World Sound and Thomas Newson released a second version of "Flute" in the UK with vocals from Lethal Bizzle titled "Flutes".

Discography

Singles

References

External links
 Official website

Australian electronic musicians
Australian musical duos
Electronic music duos
Musical groups established in 2011
2011 establishments in Australia